Live at the Jazz'Inn is a live album by pianist Jaki Byard recorded in Paris in 1971 released on the French Futura label.

Track listing 
All compositions by Jaki Byard except as indicated
 "Lady Bird" (Tadd Dameron) - 9:35   
 "Pescara to Genova to Paris" - 6:35   
 "Green-Just Blue" (Byard / Miles Davis) - 8:10   
 "Darryl" - 6:20   
 "Pagliacci" (Monticelli) - 3:05   
 "Gerald's Tune" - 3:30   
 "There Goes My Heart-San Francisco" (Traditional) - 6:00   
 "Garnerin' a Bit-Free Suite for Paris" '(Byard / Traditional) - 4:50

Personnel 
Jaki Byard - piano, alto saxophone
Gus Nemeth - bass
Jean My Truong, Gerald Byard (track 6) - drums, vibraphone

References 

Jaki Byard live albums
1971 live albums
Futura Records live albums